Mrs. Winterbourne is a 1996 American romantic comedy-drama film starring Shirley MacLaine, Ricki Lake, and Brendan Fraser.  It is loosely based on Cornell Woolrich's novel I Married a Dead Man, which had already been filmed in Hollywood as No Man of Her Own (1950) starring Barbara Stanwyck, in Hindi as Kati Patang (1970) starring Asha Parekh, and in French as J'ai épousé une ombre (1983). The film was shot on location in and around Toronto, Ontario including Eaton Hall in King City, Ontario. It was the final production of A&M Films.

Plot
On her 18th birthday, Connie Doyle meets lowlife Steve DeCunzo. She moves in with him and winds up pregnant. He kicks her out when she won't abort the baby, denying responsibility. Months later, a destitute Connie gets inadvertently swept aboard a train at Grand Central Terminal. With no ticket and no money, Connie is rescued by Hugh Winterbourne, who takes her to his private compartment. She meets his wife, Patricia, who is also pregnant. Patricia and Connie bond, and Patricia shows Connie her wedding band, which has the couple's names engraved on the inside. Patricia encourages Connie to try the ring on. When the train suddenly crashes, Patricia is thrown outside, leaving Connie the only one in the private compartment.

Eight days later, Connie wakes up in the hospital to discover she has given birth to a baby boy. Connie was found in the Winterbourne's sleeper car wearing the wedding band, and has been mistaken for Patricia.  She also learns "the other pregnant woman on the train" (Patricia, mistaken for Connie) and Hugh both died in the crash. She tries to explain, but is prevented from doing so by the hospital staff, who believe her to be hysterical. Hugh's mother, Grace, who has a bad heart, had never met Patricia before, and so assumes Connie is Patricia.  Grace calls asking Connie to come to the Winterbourne estate. With nowhere else to go, Connie accepts the offer and is driven there by Paco, the loyal chauffeur. There, Connie meets Bill, Hugh's identical twin brother. When the shock of seeing the twin of the man she is claiming as her deceased husband wears off, she nervously begins her new life. She names her newborn son Hughie, after his supposed father. Her new life is very different, and she finds it difficult to adjust. She is helped by Grace, who accepts anything she does, and gives her a socialite make-over.

Meanwhile, since the police think that Patricia was Connie, they tell Steve that Connie and his unborn baby have died. Steve doesn't really seem to care, which disturbs his new girlfriend.

Bill questions Connie closely, suspicious of inconsistencies in her story. Annoyed by this, Grace forces Connie on Bill one day, and Bill and Connie walk around Boston, and begin to bond. During the day, Connie accidentally signs her real name, which Bill notices. He investigates, learning her real identity. Bill prepares to expose Connie when he learns that Grace plans to change her will to include Connie and baby Hughie. However, he changes his mind when Connie becomes upset and begs Grace not to include her and Hughie in the will, proving to him that Connie is not after the family's money. Connie's protests make Grace want to include them even more and the will is signed. Bill and Connie are then called to help a drunk Paco, heart-broken from a recent failed romance, to his bed. He demands that Bill and Connie dance a tango before he will fall asleep. They do so, and end up sharing several kisses. Grace meets a love-struck Bill as he is leaving, and, hearing him confess concern over what Hugh would think if Bill has feelings for Hugh's (possible) widow, assures him that his brother would want him to be happy.

Connie receives an anonymous letter asking "Who are you? And whose baby is that?" She has been feeling guilty for taking advantage of Grace's (and now Bill's) kindness, but worries that any revelation of the truth would endanger Grace's life. Connie decides to leave with Hughie, and is found packing by Bill. Bill tries to convince her to stay, proposing to her. He tells her to think about it overnight. Connie decides to run away anyway. Paco follows her to the train station, tells her about his own shady past, and makes her realize she and the baby are just as valuable to Grace as Grace is to them. Connie returns home to find Grace has had a heart attack because of her sudden disappearance. She and Grace talk about Bill's proposal, and Grace tells Connie to never take the baby away again. Connie decides to accept the situation, and agrees to marry Bill as Patricia Winterbourne.

Steve saw a publicity shot of Connie as Patricia, and sent her that letter. He blackmails her to meet with him the next day, or else he will go to Grace, possibly giving her another heart attack. Grace, seeing Connie's distress from afar, sends Paco after Steve as he leaves, to discover his identity. At Steve's motel, Connie writes him a check to leave her and the baby alone, but Steve only wants it to force her into a worse scheme - pretending to kidnap Hughie, ransoming him back. If Connie goes to the police, Steve will use the check as proof that Connie approached him with the idea. Connie, terrified that Grace will die if she is frightened about Hughie being kidnapped, returns to the estate, and steals a pistol from a display case, then returns to the motel to frighten Steve into returning the incriminating check. She does not at first realize that Steve is already dead, and the pistol accidentally goes off when she finds out. Bill rushes in on the echo of the gunshot, and both Bill and Connie deny causing Steve's death. Connie talks Bill out of calling the police, and searches briefly for her own check. Failing to find it, she and Bill flee the scene, not knowing that Paco sees their fight from outside the motel. It is then that Connie begins to tell Bill about the lie she has been living, but Bill reveals that he already knows Connie's true identity, and that he loves her anyway.

The next day, which happens to be their wedding day, the priest tells Bill and Connie that Grace is outside the church, confessing to Steve's murder to the police lieutenant who came asking for Patricia Winterbourne. They rush to Grace's side, and each confesses to the murder themselves, trying to shield the others. Paco arrives in time to add his confession to the mix.

The police officers tell them they already have the murderer in custody. They only came to the church to question Connie about her check to Steve. The murderer was the woman Steve started seeing after dumping Connie. Like Connie, she had gotten pregnant and Steve had abandoned her.

Connie confesses the truth about Hughie's parentage to Grace, who says she'll still accept Connie and Hughie, adding that she'd like more grandchildren.  The wedding goes ahead, and Bill presents Connie with a wedding ring that has 'Bill & Connie' engraved on the inside (the ring she wore in the hospital having had 'Hugh & Patricia' in it). Thus Connie, who had been pretending to be Mrs. Winterbourne, finally becomes a real Mrs. Winterbourne.

Cast

 Shirley MacLaine as Grace Winterbourne 
 Ricki Lake as Connie Doyle/"Patricia Winterbourne" 
 Brendan Fraser as Bill and Hugh Winterbourne
 Miguel Sandoval as Paco
 Loren Dean as Steve DeCunzo
 Peter Gerety as Father Brian Kilraine
 Justin Vanlieshout as Baby Hughie Winterbourne
 Jane Krakowski as Christine
 Debra Monk as Lieutenant Ambrose
 Cathryn de Prume as Renee
 Susan Haskell as Patricia Winterbourne
 Bobcat Goldthwait (uncredited) as TV comedian
 Paula Prentiss (uncredited) as Maternity nurse
 Alec Thomilson as Baby Hughie Winterbourne

Reception
Mrs. Winterbourne received generally negative reviews; on Rotten Tomatoes, the film holds a 15% "Fresh" rating  from 33 reviews (5 "fresh" reviews, 28 "rotten"). Audiences polled by CinemaScore gave the film an average grade of "B" on an A+ to F scale. It was also a box office failure, grossing only $10,082,005 based on a $25 million budget.

References

External links
 
 
 

1996 films
1996 romantic comedy-drama films
American romantic comedy-drama films
Films directed by Richard Benjamin
Films based on American novels
TriStar Pictures films
Films scored by Patrick Doyle
A&M Films films
Films based on works by Cornell Woolrich
Films about the upper class
Films set in Boston
Films set in Connecticut
Films set in New Jersey
Films set in New York City
Remakes of American films
1996 comedy films
1996 drama films
1990s English-language films
1990s American films